A Cabinet of Curiosities is a compilation box set by alternative rock band Jane's Addiction, released on April 21, 2009, on Rhino Records.

Background 
The collection includes three discs of demos, rehearsals, remixes, covers, and live recordings from the group's initial lifespan of 1986–1991, and one DVD featuring the movie Soul Kiss, the band's music videos, and concert footage. Vocalist Perry Farrell stated that "it's a really nice, fetishy object."

In 2009, vocalist Perry Farrell stated that "[the] box set was supposed to be released two years ago. It just took so long. We cut that deal on the box set when we were still together on the last record, and it took that long to get it co-ordinated and gathered and all those other things and it was just kind of a happenstance that we were together at this time. When Rhino saw that we were together they thought, 'Let's just really work day and night and get the thing out.'"

Track listing 
 indicates previously unreleased tracks

Disc 1 
 "Jane Says (Radio Tokyo Demo)" *
 "Pigs in Zen (Radio Tokyo Demo)"
 "Mountain Song (Radio Tokyo Demo)"
 "Had a Dad (Radio Tokyo Demo)"
 "I Would for You (Radio Tokyo Demo)"
 "Idiots Rule (Demo)" *
 "Classic Girl (Demo)" *
 "Up the Beach (Demo)" *
 "Suffer Some (Demo)" *
 "Thank You Boys (Demo)" *
 "Summertime Rolls (Demo)" *
 "City (Demo)" *
 "Ocean Size (Demo)" *
 "Stop! (Demo)" *
 "Standing in the Shower...Thinking (Demo)" *
 "Ain't No Right (Demo)" *
 "Three Days (Demo)" *

Disc 2 
 "Ted, Just Admit It... (Demo)" *
 "Maceo (Demo)" *
 "No One's Leaving (Demo)" *
 "My Time (Rehearsal)" *
 "Been Caught Stealing (12" Remix Version)"
 "Ripple" (from Deadicated: A Tribute to the Grateful Dead)
 "Don't Call Me Nigger, Whitey" (feat. Ice-T & Ernie-C)
 "L.A. Medley: L.A. Woman/Nausea/Lexicon Devil (Live 1989)"
 "Kettle Whistle (Live 1987)" *
 "Whole Lotta Love (Live 1987)" *
 "1970 (Live 1987)" *
 "Bobhaus (Live 1989)" *

Disc 3 
Live at the Palladium 12/19/90
 "Drum Intro (Live)" *
 "Up the Beach (Live)"
 "Whores (Live)" *
 "1% (Live)" *
 "No One's Leaving (Live)"
 "Ain't No Right (Live)"
 "Then She Did... (Live)" *
 "Had a Dad (Live)" *
 "Been Caught Stealing (Live)" *
 "Three Days (Live)"
 "Mountain Song (Live)" *
 "Stop! (Live)"
 "Summertime Rolls (Live)" *
 "Ocean Size (Live)" *

DVD 
 Soul Kiss
 "Mountain Song" (Unedited Version)
 "City"

Music videos 
 "Had a Dad"
 "Ocean Size"
 "Stop!"
 "Been Caught Stealing"
 "Classic Girl"
 "Ain't No Right"

Live at the City Square in Milan (for MTV Italy, October 1990) 
 "Whores" *
 "Then She Did..." *
 "Three Days" *

Bonus Disc 5 
Live at Irvine Meadows, 7/23-24/91
(Available as a Best Buy exclusive for a limited supply)
 "Standing in the Shower...Thinking" *
 "Of Course" *
 "Ted, Just Admit It..." *
 "Mountain Song" *
 "Stop!" *

References 

Jane's Addiction albums
2009 compilation albums
Rhino Records compilation albums